Yeh Pyaar Nahi Toh Kya Hai (What Is This, If Not Love?) is an Indian romantic drama television series. Produced by Bindu and SJ Studio Productions, it premiered on 19 March 2018 on SET India and starred Palak Jain and Namit Khanna.

The show has been critically acclaimed for its crisp story line and ensemble cast's performance.

Plot
The show is set in Delhi, and revolves around Siddhant Sinha and Anushka Reddy.

Anushka Reddy, daughter of Telugu industrialist Krishna Kanth "KK" Reddy returns home after spending seven years in the US. Siddhant Sinha is a budding lawyer, belongs to middle-class Kayastha family from Bihar, and is the son of lawyer Prabhakar Sinha who was KK's legal advisor, right-hand man, confidante, and best friend. Siddhant and Anushka are childhood friends, who broke up seven years earlier due to misunderstandings.

Siddhant's father helps KK out of any disasters in both business and personal issues. Prabhakar owes KK, who helped him 18 years ago, and also values his friendship with KK. Siddhant joins his father at the Reddys' company where Anushka has joined as the head of Human Resources.

When an accident happens to KK's rival company, said company's owner, Sumit Goyal, insists it was sabotage done by KK's company, in order to win back a certain deal KK lost. Though KK's company is able to the clear the investigation, Prabhakar has a nagging theory that perhaps KK had something to do with the incident. Prabhakar dies while trying to investigate the details of the deal and the accident. Doctors confirm his death was due to sudden cardiac arrest caused by acid reflux.

15 days later
After Prabhakar's death, Siddhant starts to work full time for KK's son and Anushka's twin brother, Karthik and tries to mend his relationship with Anushka. As they get closer, Siddhant also starts investigating his father's death after finding a suspicious phone number from his father's mobile phone call history. The number leads him to Dinesh Swamy, Vice President of Goyal's aircraft company. He is shocked to discover that Swamy died exactly like Prabhakar shortly after Prabhakar's death. Meanwhile, Anushka's father is trying to convince her to marry.

KK brings Nupur Srivastava as a prospective bride for Karthik. During Karthik's wedding preparations, KK gets impressed by Nupur's politician cousin, Vedant. KK asks Anushka to accept, but since she loves Siddhant, she does not want to. Siddhant also loves Anushka, but during investigation he was shocked to know that his father was murdered by his best friend KK by poisoning him via 25 years of KKR Corporation Book. So he decides it is best to keep Anushka out of the picture as he wants to take revenge to her father. Meanwhile, Karthik works closely with Purva, Siddhant's sister, in KK's company. Karthik starts to develop a physical attraction towards Purva but tries not to act upon it.

Siddhant wishes to ruin KK and his business, therefore, he creates major misunderstandings between KK's business partners often referred to as "SHARK" and creates rifts between KK's family. Meanwhile, KK is finally seen admitting his involvement in Prabhakar's death when he is by himself.

Misunderstandings increase between Siddhant and Anushka, therefore, she decides to agree to marry Vedant. Siddhant on the other hand finds out that Vedant is only marrying Anushka for money and power reasons for his career and does not love her.

Siddhant decides he wants both his love and revenge, so on Anushka's engagement day, he openly declares his love for Anushka. Although he is met with disapproval, KK says that his happiness lies in Anushka and lets them get engaged. After the ceremony, Siddhant tells KK about how he knows KK is the reason behind Prabhakar's death and that he will take revenge for that. Siddhant quits his job at Reddy Corporation and decides to go solo. He finds out that Reddy Corporation has been very sexist towards women and fires every woman who gets pregnant and asks for maternity leave. Siddhant finds over 300 cases such as this and decides to represent them all in court, pro bono

In order to prevent Siddhant and Anushka from marrying, KK threatens Gayatri, Siddhant's mother, to stop Siddhant from marrying Anushka. Despite his mother's reluctance and KK's planning, Siddhant and Anushka get married. As KK's initial plan fails, he decides to go to Plan B, by framing Siddhant with the murder of Hira Sanyal, H of SHARK. Siddhant and Anushka finally get married, but she learns about how Siddhant believes KK killed Prabhakar. Siddhant and Anushka decide to not move their relationship forward until Siddhant is able to prove KK guilty.

Meanwhile, Karthik and Purva start to talk more and get closer. One day, Nupur sees a suspicious message on Karthik's phone, from Purva and starts to suspect them. Karthik and Nupur have an argument, in which he declares his love for Purva, and KK hears this. Purva and Karthik talk and Purva finds out the truth behind Prabhakar's death. Purva also declares her feelings for Karthik. Karthik goes to declare his love for Purva to Sinha family. Siddhant beats Karthik and Gayatri slaps Purva. Finally, Anushka learns the truth about her father. Heartbroken, she goes to meet her father and says him that she have realised all the truth about him and ask him whether his love for her was also fake as his reputation. After many instances KK confesses his mistakes in front of Anushka and drinks poison and dies.

Cast

Main
 Palak Jain as Anushka Sinha (nee Reddy)
 Namit Khanna as Siddhant Sinha

Recurring
 Manish Choudhary as Krishna Kanth "K.K." Reddy, Anushka's father
 Shahana Verma as Nita Reddy, Anushka's mother
 Vishal Malhotra as Shrikant "Anna" Reddy, Anushka's elder brother
 Suparna Krishna as Riddhi Reddy, Shrikant's wife
 Ankit Raj as Kartik Reddy, Anushka's twin brother
 Divya Sharma as Nupur Srivastava Reddy, Kartik's wife
 Gagan Rajput as Sweety Singh, Siddhant's assistant and friend
 Anurag Arora as Prabhakar Sinha, Siddhant's father
 Alka Amin as Gayatri Sinha, Siddhant's mother
 Amandeep Sidhu as Purva Sinha, Siddhant's younger sister
 Reuben Israel as Sudhanshu Nanda, Riddhi's father,
 Radha Bhatt as Heera Sanyal
 Divyagaurav Rana as Young Siddhant
 Khushi Joshi as Young Anushka
 Dinesh Mohan as Sumit Goyal, K.K.'s business rival
 Akash Jaiswal as Vedant Srivastava, politician, Nupur's cousin
 Aamir Abbas Naqvi, as an Advocate in 1 episode
 Altamash as Ravi, Anushka’s driver

Production
The show is shot in New Delhi and Greater Noida.

Soundtrack

References

External links

2018 Indian television series debuts
Hindi-language television shows
2010s Indian television miniseries
Sony Entertainment Television original programming
Television shows set in Delhi